The Jacques Delors Institute, which also uses the name Notre Europe (French for "Our Europe"), is an independent think tank based in Paris. Founded in 1996 by Jacques Delors, it aims to "think a united Europe." Enrico Letta currently serves as president of the Jacques Delors Institute, while Sébastien Maillard is its director.

The Institute was ranked 22nd among the 'Top Think Tanks in Western Europe' in the 2019 Global Go To Think Tank Report of the University of Pennsylvania, making it in third place among think tanks based in France.

In 2019, The Jacques Delors Institute Berlin merged with the Hertie School, forming the new Jacques Delors Centre. Henrik Enderlein, the president of the Hertie School also served as the director of the Jacques Delors Centre.

Since 2017, the Jacques Delors Institute also has an Office in Brussels, which became autonomous in January 2020 under the name Europe Jacques Delors, led by Geneviève Pons.

Research
Notre Europe's research is focused around four axes:
 "Visions of Europe" (European identity; European institutional reform)
 "European democracy in action" (transnational deliberative democracy; European think tanks)
 "Competition, cooperation, solidarity" (the CAP post-2013; the European budget; a European energy policy)
 "Europe and world governance" (comparative regional integration)

Notre Europe's main activity is to publish studies and to organise public symposia and seminars. Its publications are essentially produced in-house, but outside researchers and academics are also called on. Work is published in French and English, and occasionally German.

Notable debate contributions by Notre Europe include the organisation of Europe's first transnational deliberative poll, Tomorrow's Europe; a study on the poisonous budget rebate debate; an analysis of the 2005 rejection of the European constitutional treaty; an examination of European think tanks; a blueprint for a new "European social contract"; and a proposal to politicise European debate by linking the choice of European Commission president to European Parliament elections.

For the period 2019-2022, the Jacques Delors Institute participates among 15 consortium partners in the Horizon 2020 research project EU IDEA (Integration and Differentiation for Effectiveness and Accountability). Inside the project, it coordinates the Work Package 4, dealing with the Economic and Monetary Union of the European Union and the Single Market.

Académie Notre Europe
Founded in 2017 based on the initiative of Enrico Letta, the Jacques Delors Institute runs the Académie Notre Europe, which provides a training on European affairs for young people.

Governance
The Jacques Delors Institute has been successively presided by Jacques Delors (1996-2004), Pascal Lamy (2004–05), Tommaso Padoa-Schioppa (2006-2010), António Vitorino (2011-2016) and Enrico Letta. (2016–present).

The institute's main bodies are the Board of Trustees (Conseil des garants) and the Board of Directors (Conseil d'administration).
The Members of the Board of Trustees include Jacques Delors, Martine Aubry, Gerhard Cromme, Etienne Davignon, Philippe Lagayette, Pascal Lamy, and António Vitorino.

It is a member of the European Policy Institutes Network (EPIN) and frequently works in partnership with other organisations.

Financing
In 2018, the annual budget of the Jacques Delors Institute stood at 1.39 Million Euros. The biggest individual contributors to the Institute's budget were the European Commission and the French government, making up roughly 50 percent of revenues. Other partners include the companies Macif, Engie, Solvay, Enedis and the Gulbenkian Foundation.

Over the period 2016-2018, project-related contributions to the Institute's budget came, among others, from the European Parliament, the Region Île-de-France, the Caisse des dépôts, France Stratégie the European Climate Foundation and several governments of EU member states.

References

External links
  
 Jacques Delors Centre Berlin 
 Tomorrow's Europe, the first Europe-wide Deliberative Poll

Organisations based in Berlin
Organizations based in Paris
Political and economic think tanks based in France
Pro-Europeanism